Vouacapoua americana (wacapou or acapu) is a species of tree in the legume family (Fabaceae). The timber is used in heavy construction and carpentry.

Distribution 
Vouacapoua americana is found in Brazil, French Guiana, Guyana and Suriname.  It is threatened by over exploitation.

References 

Cassieae
Trees of the Amazon
Trees of Brazil
Trees of Guyana
Trees of Suriname
Trees of French Guiana
Critically endangered plants
Taxonomy articles created by Polbot
Plants described in 1775